Maman (born 30 July 1980) is a former Indonesian professional footballer who played as a midfielder for Persita Tangerang in the Indonesia Super League.

International career
He gained his only international cap on 8 April 2001 in a 2002 FIFA World Cup qualification match against the Maldives.

References

External links
 
 Player profil at goal.com

1980 births
Living people
Indonesian footballers
Liga 1 (Indonesia) players
Persita Tangerang players
Association football midfielders
People from Bogor
Sportspeople from West Java